Aliabad-e Sanjeh Bashi (also Romanized as ‘Alīābād-e Sanjeh Bāshī; also known as ‘Alīābād-e Sanjeh Vāsheh) is a village in Baqerabad Rural District, in the Central District of Mahallat County, Markazi Province, Iran. At the 2006 census, its population was 25, in 6 families.

References 

Populated places in Mahallat County